Puisieux is the name of several communes in France:

 Puisieux, Pas-de-Calais, in the Pas-de-Calais département
 Puisieux, Seine-et-Marne, in the Seine-et-Marne département

See also 
 Puisieux-et-Clanlieu, in the Aisne département
 Puisieulx, in the Marne département